Darwin is an unincorporated community in Dickenson County, Virginia, in the United States.

History
Darwin was named for the son of a postal official.

References

Unincorporated communities in Dickenson County, Virginia
Unincorporated communities in Virginia